Sinocyclocheilus guishanensis is a species of ray-finned fish in the genus Sinocyclocheilus.

References 

guishanensis
Fish described in 2003